is a Japanese retired baseball player and politician from the Liberal Democratic Party of Japan. He currently serves as member of the House of Councillors for Akita at-large district.

References

1964 births
Living people
Politicians from Akita Prefecture
Waseda University alumni
Japanese baseball players
Nippon Professional Baseball infielders
Kintetsu Buffaloes players
Yomiuri Giants players
Chiba Lotte Marines players
Yokohama BayStars players
Members of the House of Councillors (Japan)
Liberal Democratic Party (Japan) politicians
Baseball people from Akita Prefecture
Japanese sportsperson-politicians